The S2 was the first deployed French land-based strategic missile, equipped with a single nuclear warhead of 120 kilotonnes. The S2 was a two-stage, solid-propellant medium-range ballistic missile (MRBM).

Operational history 
Deployed in 1971, the main land-based component of the French nuclear deterrent was the S2 missile, rounding out their strategic nuclear triad along with air and submarine assets. Two groups totalling 18 S2 missile silos were deployed at Apt-Saint-Christol airbase, on the Plateau d'Albion in the Vaucluse region.

The S2 was replaced by the S3 SSBS in the early 1980s.

References

Intermediate-range ballistic missiles
Ballistic missiles of France
Nuclear missiles of France
Projects established in 1971
1970s in France
Military equipment introduced in the 1970s